Georg Joel (8 August 1898 in Wilhelmshaven – 10 October 1981 in Rastede) was a German Nazi Party politician. He was the long-serving Deputy Gauleiter of Gau Weser-Ems and also Minister-president of the Free State of Oldenburg throughout the Nazi regime. After the Second World War, he joined Neo-Nazi parties and served in the Landtag of Lower Saxony.

Early life
The son of a locksmith, Joel attended secondary school in Wilhelmshaven. He then worked for the Grand Duchy of Oldenburg State Railways from November 1914 to April 1917. From 1 May 1917 to December 1918, he served in the Imperial German Army in the First World War. He was deployed on the Western Front in Field Artillery Regiment 62. He attained the rank of Unteroffizier and was awarded the Iron Cross, 2nd Class. After the war he was employed as a state railroad official in the civil service until 1933.

Joel was attracted to right wing politics and in 1920 joined Deutschvölkischer Schutz- und Trutzbund, the largest, most active, and most influential anti-Semitic federation in Germany. In 1922 he joined the Nazi Party. When the Party was banned in the aftermath of the Beer Hall Putsch, he gravitated to the German Völkisch Freedom Party, another nationalist, right wing organization. On 6 April 1925, he and others founded a local Nazi group in Oldenburg after the ban on the Nazi Party was lifted. Joel formally rejoined the Party on 12 August 1925 (membership number 15,490).

Nazi party career
Joel was elected as a City Councilor in Oldenburg, serving from November 1930 to March 1933. He next was elected to the Free State of Oldenburg’s Landtag on 17 May 1931, remaining a member until May 1933 and serving as its president from 16 June 1932. After the Nazi seizure of power, Joel served as Special Staatskommissar (State Commissioner) to the Free State of Oldenburg from March to 6 May 1933. After Carl Röver was appointed Reichsstatthalter (Reich Governor) of the state, Joel succeeded him as Minister-president of the Oldenburg state government on 6 May 1933, remaining at the head of the administration until the end of the Nazi regime in May 1945. He concurrently served as the Minister for foreign affairs, interior affairs, trade and transport.

In August 1932 Joel was selected as the Deputy Gauleiter of Gau Weser-Ems. He served successively under Gauleiters Carl Röver and Paul Wegener until 5 May 1945, becoming one of the longest-serving Deputy Gauleiters. On 29 March 1936 he was elected a deputy to the German Reichstag from electoral constituency 14 (Weser-Ems) serving until the end of the Nazi regime. From 1937 to 30 January 1939 and again from November 1943 to May 1945, he also served as Leader of the Gau Personnel Office (Gaupersonalamtsleiter). From 1 September 1939 to 16 November 1942, Joel was Reich Defense Advisor in Gau Weser-Ems and a member of the Defense Committee of Wehrkreis (Military District) XI. A member of the Sturmabteilung (SA), he attained the rank of SA-Brigadeführer on 9 November 1937 and was assigned to the leadership corps of SA-Gruppe Nordsee.

In the closing days of the Second World War Gauleiter Paul Wegener was made Supreme Reich Defense Commissioner-North and left for Flensburg. Consequently, Joel ran the affairs of Gau Weser-Ems as Acting Gauleiter in Wegener's absence from 26 April 1945. British forces already were overrunning the Gau, and all German forces in northwestern Germany laid down their arms on 5 May 1945 by the German surrender at Lüneburg Heath. Joel was eventually arrested on 27 May and interned in Esterwegen.

Postwar life
On 5 July 1946, Joel was released from internment for health reasons. Following procedures by the Denazification Court in Bielefeld, he was classified as Category III (a lesser offender) and sentenced on 16 June 1949 to two years in prison, with partial credit for time served. On 19 April 1950, Joel found employment as a sales representative in Oldenburg.

In 1955 Joel reentered politics and joined the Deutsche Reichspartei (German Reich Party, DRP), a far-right, nationalist and Neo-Nazi group. In 1956 Joel became a City Councilor of Oldenburg. He was elected on the DRP slate to the Landtag of Lower Saxony, serving from 6 May 1955 to 5 May 1959. He served from May 1955 to October 1957 and from June 1958 to May 1959 as Party spokesman in the Landtag. From 1957 to 1959 and from 1963 to 1964 he was a member of the party executive committee. In 1961 he was Deputy Chairman of the DRP Regional Association of Lower Saxony.

In 1964, the DRP merged with other small right wing parties to form the National Democratic Party of Germany (NPD), another ultra-nationalist, Neo-Nazi entity.  Joel was a member of its party executive committee and editor of their weekly newspaper Deutsche Nachrichten (German News). In 1967 he became the owner of its publishing house, Deutsche Nachrichten GmbH. In 1979 and 1980 Joel led the fight against the installation of a memorial plaque in the former Esterwegen concentration camp.

Until the end of his life, Joel remained an unrepentant Nazi sympathizer and denied the criminal character of the National Socialist regime.

References

External links

Sources

1898 births
1981 deaths
Gauleiters
German newspaper editors
German Völkisch Freedom Party politicians
Members of the Reichstag of Nazi Germany
Nazi Party officials
Nazi Party politicians
People from Wilhelmshaven
Recipients of the Iron Cross (1914), 2nd class
Sturmabteilung officers
German Army personnel of World War I